Jonny Andersson (born 25 April 1964 in Kungsbacka, Sweden), is a former Swedish International motorcycle trials rider. Andersson was the Swedish National Trials Champion in 1985 and the Canadian National Trials Champion in 1987 and 1988.

Biography
Andersson was Swedish National Trials champion in 1985, and a member of the Swedish Trial des Nations team that finished 5th in Piano Rancho, Italy. The other team members were Lars Karlsson, Urban Lindholm and Martin Karlsson.

After relocating to Texas, Andersson competed in North America during the 1987 season. He finished 3rd in the US NATC Pro series behind former world champion Bernie Schreiber and Ryan Young. Riding a little further north he won the Canadian CMA National Trials Championship.

He retained his Canadian title in 1988 and moved up to 2nd place in the NATC final standings, beaten by Ryan Young.

1989 was to be Andersson's final year in North America. He once again finished runner-up in the NATC Pro series to Young, after winning the Texas, Utah and both final Washington rounds.

National Trials Championship Career

International Trials Championship Career

Honors
 Swedish National Trials Champion 1985
 Canadian National Trials Champion 1987, 1988

Related Reading
NATC Trials Championship
FIM Trial European Championship
FIM Trial World Championship

References 

1964 births
Living people
Swedish motorcycle racers
Motorcycle trials riders